Wildlife Pop is the debut studio album of electronic/pop group Stepdad, released in 2012.

Critical reception
The Chicago Tribune wrote that "the pleasures crop up enough that this electro-pop tingles with the soothing energy of running a 5K and flopping onto a bed of cotton candy." The Detroit Metro Times wrote that the band "makes some of the weirdest, most fun and interesting 8-bit electro pop around."

Track listing

References

2012 debut albums
Stepdad (band) albums